The 1979–80 National Football League was the 49th staging of the National Football League (NFL), an annual Gaelic football tournament for the Gaelic Athletic Association county teams of Ireland.

Cork defeated Kerry in an all-Munster final.

Format

Divisions 
 Division One: 12 teams. Split into two regional groups of 6 (North and South)
 Division Two: 20 teams. Split into two 10 team regional sub-divisions of North and South, which were divided into five teams each.

Titles 
Teams in both divisions competed for the National Football League title.

There was also a separate National Football League Division Two title.

Knockout stage qualifiers 
 Division One (North): top 3 teams
 Division One (South): top 3 teams
 Division Two (North): winners
 Division Two (South): winners

Promotion and relegation 

This was the last season of the present league format. For the 1980–81 season, the 32 counties were divided into four divisions of eight teams. The teams were not placed into the new structure entirely in line with their placings in the 1979–80 league.

Group stage

Division One (North)

Division One (North) Play-offs

Table

Division One (South)

Table

Division Two (North)

Division Two (North) Final

Group A table

Group B table

Division Two (South)

Division Two (South) Final

Group A table

Group B table

Knockout stage

Quarter-finals

Semi-final

Final

Division Two Final

References

See also 
Cork–Kerry Gaelic football rivalry

National Football League
National Football League
National Football League (Ireland) seasons